The following is a list of elections held to determine the officeholder of the position of Speaker of the House of Representatives of the Philippines.

10th Congress

12th Congress

13th Congress

14th Congress

2007 election

2008 election

15th Congress
Feliciano Belmonte Jr. won against Edcel Lagman for the House speakership.

16th Congress
Feliciano Belmonte retained his post as House Speaker after he secured the most votes from the legislature, beating Ronaldo Zamora and Ferdinand Romualdez.

17th Congress

2016 election
The House of Representatives voted for Pantaleon Alvarez as its speaker on July 26, 2016, when it opened its first session.

2018 election
The start of the 2018 State of the Nation Address of President Rodrigo Duterte on July 23, 2018, was delayed by almost half an hour after the House of Representatives informally convened to install Gloria Macapagal Arroyo as House Speaker, with 161 members voting for her appointment. Alvarez disputed the appointment and his allies blocked the declaration of the position as vacant. The House convened in a formal session in the evening after the presidential speech to conduct another vote. 243 members were recorded to be present with 199 representatives participating; 184 voting in favor of Arroyo's appointment, three casting a "no" vote, and 12 officially abstaining from the vote. The session which included Arroyo's formal election was recorded in House Resolution No. 2025.

18th Congress

2019 election
The House of Representatives voted for Alan Peter Cayetano as its speaker on July 22, 2019, when it opened its first session.

2020 election
186 members of the House of Representatives gathered on October 12, 2020, at Celebrity Sports Complex in Quezon City to elect Lord Allan Velasco as the new speaker ousting then incumbent Alan Peter Cayetano. This was initially disputed by Cayetano until October 13, 2020, when the same number of representatives ratified Velasco's election as speaker during a special session at the Batasang Pambansa.

19th Congress

2022 election

References

Speaker of the Philippine House of Representatives elections
Elections of legislative speakers